South of the Chisholm Trail is a 1947 American Western film directed by Derwin Abrahams and written by Michael Simmons. The film stars Charles Starrett, Nancy Saunders, Hank Newman and Smiley Burnette. The film was released on January 30, 1947, by Columbia Pictures.

Plot

Cast          
Charles Starrett as Steve Haley / The Durango Kid
Nancy Saunders as Nora Grant
Hank Newman as Hank Newman
Smiley Burnette as Smiley Burnette
Frank Sully as Big Jim Grady
Jim Diehl as Berke
Jack Ingram as Chet Tobin
George Chesebro as Doc Walker
Frank LaRue as Pop Grant
Jock Mahoney as Thorpe
Eddie Parker as Sheriff Palmer

References

External links
 

1947 films
American Western (genre) films
1947 Western (genre) films
Columbia Pictures films
Films directed by Derwin Abrahams
American black-and-white films
1940s English-language films
1940s American films